On June 17, 2005, the United States House of Representatives passed , a bill to cut funds to the United Nations in half by 2008 if it did not meet with certain criteria laid out in the legislation. The United States is estimated to contribute about 22% of the UN's yearly budget—this bill would have had a large impact on the UN. The George W. Bush administration and several former US ambassadors to the UN warned that it would have strengthened anti-American sentiment around the world and would have hurt UN reform movements.

It failed to pass Congress.

The author of the bill was House International Relations Committee Chairman Henry Hyde, a Republican from Illinois. It was approved by the House in a vote of 221–184. Supporters of the bill claim that more passive efforts to reform the UN have failed in the past, and it is now time to try a technique that shows the United States has "some teeth in reform."

While some were excited to see the United States proposing to reform the UN, many people held equally strong views that the House was making a mistake.

External links
Bill Summary & Status

Proposed legislation of the 109th United States Congress
Act